The following is the list of squads for each of the 16 teams competing in the FIBA EuroBasket 2007, held in Spain between 3 and 16 September 2007. Each team selected a squad of 12 players for the tournament.

Group A

Greece

Israel

Russia

Serbia

Group B

Croatia

Latvia

Portugal

Spain

Group C

Czech Republic

Germany

Lithuania

Turkey

Group D

France

Italy

Poland

Slovenia

References
 2007 EuroBasket, FIBA.com.

2007